Singer & Sons is an American sitcom starring Harold Gould and Esther Rolle that was originally broadcast on NBC as a summer replacement series from June 9 to June 27, 1990.

Synopsis
Nathan Singer is a Jewish widower who becomes the third generation to run a family-owned New York City delicatessen called "Singer & Sons." Singer is the first not to have sons inherit it until Sarah, his housekeeper and longtime friend, suggests that he recruit her two sons. Begrudgingly, Nathan hires her sons – Mitchell and Reggie – two brothers with opposite personalities who help bring new life to the business.

Cast
Harold Gould as Nathan Singer
Esther Rolle as Sarah Patterson
Bobby Hosea as Mitchell Patterson
Tommy Ford as Reggie Patterson
Brooke Fontaine as Deanna Patterson
Fred Stoller as Sheldon Singer
Arnetia Walker as Claudia James
Anne Berger as Mrs. Tarkasian
Phil Leeds as Lou Gold

Episodes

References

External links
 
TV Guide

1990 American television series debuts
1990 American television series endings
1990s American sitcoms
English-language television shows
Jewish comedy and humor
Television series about Jews and Judaism
NBC original programming
Television shows set in New York City
Television series by Disney
Television series by ABC Studios
Television series created by Michael Jacobs